The Wednesday Strangler is an unidentified Japanese serial killer, responsible for the murders of seven women in Saga Prefecture from 1975 and 1989. The nickname comes from the fact that six of the victims disappeared on a Wednesday. The killings are also referred to as the Saga Women Murders.

Three of the murder cases (of the fifth through seventh victims, in 1989) were prosecuted under the "Kitagata Affair". However, the man was found to be innocent and promptly acquitted, leaving the cases unsolved.

Overview 
Between 1975 and 1989, seven murders occurred in a 20-kilometer radius of the Saga Prefecture, in the towns of Kitagata, Shiroishi, Kitashigeyasu and Takeo. All of them had the following characteristics.

 In six of the seven cases, the victims disappeared on a Wednesday
 Vanished during the evening or night hours
 Five of the deaths were due to strangulation (the remaining two were skeletonized, and the causes of death couldn't be ascertained)

For the fourth case, the statute of limitations expired, because of which the investigating agency couldn't prosecute the criminal. The remaining three were indicted, but were acquitted during the trial, and all seven of the murders remain unsolved.

In March 2005, Kitashigeyasu, along with Nakabaru and Mine, merged with to become the city of Miyaki. Also, in March 2006, Kitagata was merged with Takeo.

Murders 
 On August 27, 1975, a 12-year-old junior high school student living in Kitagata, named Y., disappeared near a telephone booth while en route to home, last seen with a man. She was found dead on June 27, 1980, in one of the toilet stalls next to the elementary school pool in Shiroishi.
 On April 12, 1980, a 20-year-old living in the town of Shiroishi, named H., disappeared in the same circumstances as the previous victim. About two months later, on June 24,  she was found dead in an elementary school toilet in the town. This is the only murder to not have occurred on a Wednesday - instead, it was on a Sunday.
 On October 7, 1981, I., a 27-year-old factory employee living  in Shiroishi, disappeared. On October 21, her strangled body was found in a vacant lot in Nakabaru.
 On February 17, 1982, a 11-year-old fifth grader, named A., was strangled to death in Kitagata while walking home to school.
 On July 8, 1987, a 48-year-old restaurant employee in Takeo, named H., disappeared mysteriously. She was found dead on January 27, 1989, beneath a cliff at Kitagata Otoge. The following two bodies were found in the same location, and are collectively known as the "Kitagata Affair".
 On December 7, 1988, 50-year-old housewife named N. disappeared from Kitagata.
 On January 25, 1989, a 37-year-old office worker based in Kitamachi, named Y., also disappeared.

Kitagata Affair 
Around 5 PM on January 27, 1989, a couple driving near a mountain forest in Kishima District found three female bodies dropped beneath a cliff, and reported it to the police. The victims were identified as restaurant employee H., housewife N. and office worker Y. It is believed that they were killed on July 8, 1987; December 7, 1988, and the last on January 25, two days before the bodies were found. Items belonging to the victims were allegedly discarded within a 2-mile radius of the site where the bodies were found.

In November of the same year, a 26-year-old  man, who had been detained for an unconnected crime, admitted to three of the murders during a cognitive interview, but later recanted the confession. On June 11, 2002, the Saga Prefecture police charged the prisoner with the murder of Y., while he was incarcerated in Kagoshima Prison, later charging him with the other ones. The indictment was filed on July 7, approximately six hours before the statute of limitations for the murder expired. On October 22, the trial began, with the prosecution arguing in favor of the death penalty. On April 10, 2005, the Saga District Court cited lack of conclusive evidence and coercion by the interrogating officers for their reasoning for finding the defendant innocent of all charges.

The prosecution appealed the decision, but the Fukuoka High Court acquitted him on March 19, 2007, as was the case with the Saga District Court in the first instance. In the second trial, the prosecution tried to use newly obtained mitochondrial DNA for any possible connections to the victims, but again, the defendant was cleared. In the judgment, the Saga Prefectural Police admitted to conducting a poor investigation, including over-interrogating the suspect. On March 29, the Fukuoka department of the Supreme Public Prosecutors' Office found numerous case violations relating to the prosecutors' appeal, which was overturned, also taking into account the scarce evidence. No appeal was made after the April 2nd deadline, and the defendant was acquitted. As a result, the statute of limitations for the four cases expired, and they remain unsolved to this day. The accused criticized the Saga Prefectural Police and the prosecutor's poor investigation and prosecution, as pointed out in the ruling of the second trial.

Supplements 

 Other examples of faulty prosecution and vacation of the death penalty in Japan include, as shown from Supreme Court statistics from 1958 onward, include the 1961 Nabari poison wine incident. The 41-year-old suspect was acquitted by the Tsu District Court in 1964, but his appeal for the death sentence was only finalized in 1972. Requests for a retrial have been repeatedly filed.
 Another would be the so-called "Shimada Case", where the defendant was acquitted before the Shizuoka District Court upon retrial in 1989. It was one of the four major miscarriages of justice in the 1980s, the Kitagata Affair was the 9th case of the post-war period, 16 years after the Shimada Case.
 This case was the first acquittal before the Supreme Court since 1978. However, the first and second instances concerning the Tsuchida bombings, the accused was acquitted and spared the death penalty, but found guilty of larceny. He was given a year of imprisonment, and a suspended sentence of 2 years.
 On March 20, 2007, following the acquittal from both courts, the Fukuoka Bar Association issued a statement calling for the realization of recorded interviews between authorities and suspects.

See also 
 Capital punishment in Japan
 List of miscarriage of justice cases
 Acquittal
 List of fugitives from justice who disappeared
 List of serial killers by country
 North Kanto Serial Young Girl Kidnapping and Murder Case

References 
 Kitamachi consecutive female murder case (West Japan Newspaper WORDBOX)
 Kitagata Affair (Tohoku Nippo Web Tohoku/News Encyclopedia)
 March 21, 2007 (Kyoto Shimbun)
 Kobe Shimbun News & Editorial (May 13, 2005)
 Sanyo Shimbun News & Editorial (March 21, 2007)
 Tokyo Shimbun, editorial (March 21, 2007)

External links 
 Fukuoka Bar Association's Chairman's Declaration on the appeals of the Female Murder Defendant in Kitashigeyasu, Saga

1975 murders in Japan
1980 murders in Japan
1982 murders in Japan
1988 murders in Japan
1989 murders in Japan
1970s murders in Japan
1980s murders in Japan
Deaths by strangulation
Incidents of violence against girls
Fugitives
Male serial killers
Murderers of children
Unidentified serial killers
Unsolved murders in Japan
Violence against women in Japan